Abbas Sheibani (12 November 1931 – 22 December 2022) was an Iranian physician, university professor and conservative and principlist politician. He was a founding member of Freedom Movement of Iran and member of City Council of Tehran. He also served as a member in both Parliament House and Assembly of Experts for Constitution. He was also Minister of Agriculture from 1979 to 1980 and President of University of Tehran from 1983 to 1984. He was also a candidate for the presidential elections in July 1981 and in 1989, finishing second in both of them.

Sheibani died on 22 December 2022, at the age of 91.

References

1931 births
2022 deaths
People from Tehran
University of Tehran alumni
Government ministers of Iran
Freedom Movement of Iran politicians
Members of the Assembly of Experts
Islamic Association of Physicians of Iran politicians
Central Council of the Islamic Republican Party members
Alliance of Builders of Islamic Iran politicians
National Front (Iran) student activists
Candidates in the July 1981 Iranian presidential election
Chancellors of the University of Tehran
Council of the Islamic Revolution members
Popular Front of Islamic Revolution Forces politicians
Members of the 1st Islamic Consultative Assembly
Members of the 2nd Islamic Consultative Assembly
Members of the 3rd Islamic Consultative Assembly
Members of the 4th Islamic Consultative Assembly
Members of the 5th Islamic Consultative Assembly
Members of the Assembly of Experts for Constitution
Tehran Councillors 2013–2017
Tehran Councillors 2007–2013
Tehran Councillors 2003–2007
Iranian Science and Culture Hall of Fame recipients in Medicine